Maly Kunaley (Baga Khunilaa) is a rural locality (a selo) and the administrative centre of Malokunaleyskoye Rural Settlement, Bichursky District, Republic of Buryatia, Russia. The population was 1,186 as of 2017. There are 19 streets.

Geography 
Maly Kunaley is located 20 km east of Bichura (the district's administrative centre) by road. Poselye is the nearest rural locality.

References 

Rural localities in Bichursky District